Uki or UKI may refer to:

Uki Goñi, writer, journalist and musician
Uki, New South Wales, an Australian town
Uki, Kumamoto, a Japanese city
Uki Island in Solomon Islands
Uki (TV series), a pre-school animated television programme from Belgium
Mohammad Kautsar Hikmat, Indonesian guitarist best known as Uki of Noah

UKI
Ukiah Municipal Airport, an IATA airport code
UKI Partnerships, a British insurance underwriters
Universitas Kristen Indonesia (Christian University of Indonesia), a private Christian university in Indonesia

See also
Uke (disambiguation)